Godeok-dong is a dong, neighbourhood of Gangdong-gu in Seoul, South Korea.

History
Godeok means "high virtue" in Korean. During the Late 14th century, Yangjung Lee, a public officer of the Goryeo Dynasty, strongly rejected a conciliatory offer to turn into Joseon Dynasty, a new regime after the Goryeo Dynasty. Due to his high loyalty to his government, he was admired by the general public and they called his residential area "Godeok".   In 1995, Seoul Subway Line 5 was passed through this area stopping at Godeok Station and Myeongil Station.

Area information
The postal code of Godeok-dong is 134-080. 134 is for Gangdong-gu and 080 is for Godeok-dong.

See also 
Administrative divisions of Seoul
Administrative divisions of South Korea

References

External links
Gangdong-gu official website
Gangdong-gu map at the Gangdong-gu official website
 Gangdong-gu map
 The Godeok 1 dong Resident office

Neighbourhoods of Gangdong District